James Stewart (born 4 March 1994) is a professional Australian rules footballer playing for the Essendon Football Club in the Australian Football League (AFL). He is the son of former  footballer, Craig Stewart.

Stewart played for the Sandringham Dragons in the TAC Cup, he was recruited by the Greater Western Sydney Giants with pick 27 in the 2012 national draft and made his debut in round 23, 2013, against  at Metricon Stadium. He was traded to Essendon at the end of the 2016 season.

Stewart is currently studying a Bachelor of Commerce/Arts at Deakin University. He completed school in 2012 at Scotch College, Melbourne.

Statistics
Statistics are correct to the end of 2020

|- style="background-color: #EAEAEA"
! scope="row" style="text-align:center" | 2013
|
| 36 || 1 || 0 || 0 || 1 || 1 || 2 || 1 || 1 || 0.0 || 0.0 || 1.0 || 1.0 || 2.0 || 1.0 || 1.0
|- 
! scope="row" style="text-align:center" | 2014
|
| 36 || 3 || 3 || 4 || 24 || 10 || 34 || 9 || 3 || 1.0 || 1.3 || 8.0 || 3.3 || 11.3 || 3.0 || 1.0
|- style="background-color: #EAEAEA"
! scope="row" style="text-align:center" | 2015
|
| 36 || 13 || 15 || 14 || 78 || 52 || 130 || 42 || 25 || 1.2 || 1.1 || 6.0 || 4.0 || 10.0 || 3.2 || 1.9
|- 
! scope="row" style="text-align:center" | 2016
|
| 36 || 1 || 0 || 1 || 2 || 2 || 4 || 2 || 0 || 0.0 || 1.0 || 2.0 || 2.0 || 4.0 || 2.0 || 0.0
|-
|- style="background-color: #EAEAEA"
! scope="row" style="text-align:center" | 2017
|
| 17 || 16 || 22 || 16 || 114 || 82 || 196 || 69 || 34 || 1.4 || 1.0 || 7.1 || 5.1 || 12.3 || 4.3 || 2.1
|-
! scope="row" style="text-align:center" | 2018
|
| 17 || 11 || 15 || 13 || 83 || 55 || 138 || 55 || 17 || 1.4 || 1.2 || 7.6 || 5.0 || 12.6 || 5.0 || 1.6
|- class="sortbottom"
|-
|- style="background-color: #EAEAEA"
! scope="row" style="text-align:center" | 2019
|
| 17 || 0 || 0 || 0 || 0 || 0 || 0 || 0 || 0 || 0.0 || 0.0 || 0.0 || 0.0 || 0.0 || 0.0 || 0.0
|- class="sortbottom"
|-
! scope="row" style="text-align:center" | 2020
|
| 17 || 10 || 11 || 4 || 50 || 25 || 75 || 33 || 10 || 1.1 || 0.4 || 5.0 || 2.5 || 7.5 || 3.3 || 1.0
|- class="sortbottom"
! colspan=3| Career
! 55
! 66
! 52
! 352
! 227
! 579
! 211
! 90
! 1.2
! 1.0
! 6.4
! 4.1
! 10.5
! 3.8
! 1.6
|}

References

External links

1994 births
Living people
Greater Western Sydney Giants players
Australian rules footballers from Victoria (Australia)
Sandringham Dragons players
Essendon Football Club players